Intimate Strangers is an Australian mini series about a married couple put at risk when both parties become infatuated with other people.

Cast

 Carmen Duncan - Elodie
 Kit Taylor - Greg
 Lulu Pinkus - Dirk
 Tony Bonner - Jerome Hartog

References

External links
Intimate Strangers at IMDb

1980s Australian television miniseries
1981 Australian television series debuts
1981 Australian television series endings
1981 television films
1981 films